Alan Letang (born September 4, 1975) is a Canadian-Croatian former professional ice hockey player. In 2021, he was named the head coach for the Sarnia Sting of the Ontario Hockey League.

Playing career
Letang was drafted by the Montreal Canadiens in the 8th round, 203rd overall in the 1993 NHL Entry Draft. He has played 14 games in the National Hockey League for the Dallas Stars, Calgary Flames and New York Islanders.

Letang played for the Hamburg Freezers of the German Deutsche Eishockey Liga (DEL) from 2004 to 2007, before joining fellow DEL outfit Nürnberg Ice Tigers for the 2007–08 season. In 2008–09, he played in Austria with HC TWK Innsbruck.

For the 2009–10 season, Letang signed with Croatian club KHL Medveščak Zagreb on June 18, 2009. As captain of Medveščak, Alan scored 10 goals and 19 assists for 29 points in 50 games to finish second among defensemen on the team. After leading KHL to the second round of the EBEL playoffs, Letang signed a two-year contract extension to remain with KHL Medveščak Zagreb on March 20, 2010. He eventually played for the Zagreb team until he retired in 2014.

Coaching career 
On July 22, 2014, Letang announced that he has ended his playing career, but would stay at KHL Medveščak Zagreb as an assistant coach. After two years on the Zagreb coaching staff and a total of seven seasons with the club, Letang headed back to his native Canada and was named assistant coach of the Owen Sound Attack of the Ontario Hockey League (OHL) on June 21, 2016. On January 28, 2019, Letang was named interim coach of the Owen Sound Attack before having the interim tag removed. He left the Attack in 2021 to become the head coach of the OHL's Sarnia Sting.

Career statistics

Regular season and playoffs

References

External links

1975 births
Augsburger Panther players
Bridgeport Sound Tigers players
Calgary Flames players
Canadian expatriate ice hockey players in Austria
Canadian expatriate ice hockey players in Croatia
Canadian expatriate ice hockey players in Germany
Canadian expatriate ice hockey players in Switzerland
Canadian ice hockey defencemen
Cornwall Royals (OHL) players
Croatian ice hockey defencemen
Croatian people of Canadian descent
Dallas Stars players
EV Zug players
Fredericton Canadiens players
Hamburg Freezers players
HC TWK Innsbruck players
Ice hockey people from Ontario
Kaufbeurer Adler players
KHL Medveščak Zagreb players
Living people
Kalamazoo Wings (1974–2000) players
Montreal Canadiens draft picks
New York Islanders players
Newmarket Royals players
People from Renfrew County
Saint John Flames players
Sarnia Sting players
SC Langnau players
Sinupret Ice Tigers players
Utah Grizzlies (AHL) players